"Something About You" is a song by English singer-songwriter Jamelia. It was written by Jamelia, Carsten "Soulshock" Schack, and Peter Biker for her third studio album, Walk with Me (2006), while production was helmed by Biker and Schack. Jamelia described the sound of the song as being more "experimental and not as "R&B" as her previous material." "Something About You" was released as the album's lead single on 11 September 2006.

Chart performance
"Something About You," released as a download single first, charted at number 28 upon its download release on the official UK Singles Chart, the second highest new entry on downloads alone in that week. The physical formats were released one day after the song had charted on downloads only. It rose to number 10 in its second week on the chart and rose again to number nine in its third week. "Something About You" also climbed into the top five of the UK's radio airplay chart, peaking at number four in its third week.

Music video
An accompanying music video for "Something About You" was directed by Stuart Orme. The clip begins with two scenes alternating between her doing various poses against a glass window and her standing by a bed, showing the camera zooming out to show a man. Halfway through the video, Jamelia is having what seems to be a tea party on a grass and one scene shows her in a thin walkway with white walls. The video premiered on Channel 4 in August 2006.

Track listings

Charts

Weekly charts

Year-end charts

Release history

References

2006 singles
2006 songs
Jamelia songs
Parlophone singles
Songs written by Jamelia
Songs written by Soulshock